Scrobipalpa divergens is a moth in the family Gelechiidae. It was described by Povolný in 2002. It is found in China (Xinjiang).

References

Scrobipalpa
Moths described in 2002